Christian Baretti (born 2 July 1973 in Munich) is a German politician, representative of the Christian Social Union of Bavaria.

See also
 List of Christian Social Union of Bavaria politicians

References

Christian Social Union in Bavaria politicians
1973 births
Living people
Politicians from Munich
Ludwig Maximilian University of Munich alumni
21st-century German politicians